The nickname Scoop or Scoops may refer to:

 Scoops Carry (1915–1970), American jazz alto saxophonist and clarinetist
 Scoops Carey (baseball) (1870–1916), Major League Baseball first baseman
 Dick Gordon (sports writer) (1911–2008), American sports journalist
 Henry M. Jackson (1912–1983), American senator
 Scoop Jackson (writer) (born 1963), American sports journalist and cultural critic
 Antonio Jardine (born 1988), American basketball player
 Scoop Lewry (1919–1992), Canadian politician and reporter
 Wes Nisker (born 1942), author, radio commentator, comedian and Buddhist meditation instructor
 Art Scharein (1905–1969), American Major League Baseball third baseman
 Scoop Stanisic (born 1963), Serbian former American soccer goalkeeper and coach
 Jim Veltman (born 1966), Canadian retired lacrosse player
 Frank "Scoop" Vessels (1952–2010), American off-road truck racer
 Brian Windhorst (born 1978), American sportswriter

Lists of people by nickname